Acacia amblyophylla is a shrub belonging to the genus Acacia and the subgenus Phyllodineae that is native to an area along the west coast of Western Australia.

Description
The glabrous branchlets support patent to inclined phyllodes that have an oblanceolate shape and are slightly recurved.
It blooms from August to September and produces yellow flowers. The simple racemose inflorescences have a length of  containing globular flower-heads, each made up of around 25 pale golden flowers.

Taxonomy
The species was first formally described by the botanist Ferdinand von Mueller in 1882 as part of the work Definitions of some new Australian plants as published in the Southern Science Record. It was reclassified in 2003 by Leslie Pedley as Racosperma amblyophyllum then transferred back into the genus Acacia in 2006.

A amblyophylla is quite similar to Acacia microbotrya which occurs further south.

The type specimen was collected from Shark Bay by von Mueller in 1877.

Distribution
It is native to an area near Shark Bay in the Gascoyne region of Western Australia where it is found on limestone rises and coastal dunes growing in calcareous sandy soils.

See also
List of Acacia species

References

amblyophylla
Acacias of Western Australia
Plants described in 1882
Taxa named by Ferdinand von Mueller